Harzvorland-Huy was a Verwaltungsgemeinschaft ("collective municipality") in the district of Harz, in Saxony-Anhalt, Germany. It was situated between Wernigerode and Halberstadt. The seat of the Verwaltungsgemeinschaft was in Ströbeck. It was disbanded on 1 January 2010.

The Verwaltungsgemeinschaft Harzvorland-Huy consisted of the following municipalities:

 Aspenstedt 
 Athenstedt 
 Danstedt 
 Langenstein 
 Sargstedt 
 Ströbeck

Former Verwaltungsgemeinschaften in Saxony-Anhalt